Downtown Spruce Pine Historic District is a national historic district located at Spruce Pine, Mitchell County, North Carolina. The district encompasses 33 contributing buildings in the central business district of Spruce Pine.  It was developed between 1909 and 1953, and includes notable examples of Early Commercial and Tudor Revival style architecture.  Located in the district is the separately listed Gunter Building.  Other notable buildings include the Spruce Pine Depot (1909), Crystal Place (1937), (former) Town Hall (1940), and Day's Drug Store (1950).

It was added to the National Register of Historic Places in 2003.

Gallery

References

Historic districts on the National Register of Historic Places in North Carolina
Tudor Revival architecture in North Carolina
Buildings and structures in Mitchell County, North Carolina
National Register of Historic Places in Mitchell County, North Carolina